Linn County is the name of four counties in the United States:

Linn County, Iowa, most populous Linn County in the United States
Linn County, Kansas 
Linn County, Missouri 
Linn County, Oregon

See also

Linn County (band)
Lynn County, Texas
Lin County

fr:Comté de Linn